Kollamkondan was a territory (Zamin) in the former Tirunelveli province of Madurai Nayak Dynasty ruled by Polygar. Post Independence of India it split into as 2 villages Ayan Kollan Kondan and Zamin Kollan Kondan and come under Virudhunagar District in the southern Indian State of Tamil Nadu in India.

Palayam Location
This Maravar palayam was located near Rajapalayam, at the foot of the Western Ghats, in the former Tirunelveli province of the Pandiyar dynasty of Madura.

Polygar
Polygar Vandayar Thevar belonged to the Pandaram subcaste of the Maravar. The polygar family was granted the lands by Raja Parakrama Pandya of Pandya Dynasty before the establishment of the Madurai state by Visvanatha Nayaka in the 16th century. It joined Puli Thevar's coalition in 1754-1762. The polygar of Kollamkondan led a new insurrection in 1764, following Yusuf Khan's execution for having betrayed the Nawab. Victories over the Anglo-Nawabi forces helped the revolt spread to other polygars.

Decline and Merger with Sethur Zamin
After 1766, General Donald Campbell began a systematic campaign, taking the forts of the major confederates one by one. In 1802, the polygar of Kollamkondan, held only four villages. In 1879, the zamindari had an area of 1.35 sq. m., and a population of 9,021. Later in the 19th century it was included in the zamindari of Sethur.

Post abolition of Zamindari
Kollamkondan post independence comprises 2 villages . Both are revenue villages under the Rajapalayam Taluk
 Zamin Kollan kondan
 Ayan Kollan kondan - Notable person post independence - Dr.N.Rasaiah - Tamilwriter

References

Madurai Nayak dynasty
Palayam